Master of My Make-Believe is the second studio album by American musician and singer Santigold, released in the United Kingdom on April 24, 2012 and in the United States on May 1, through Downtown and Atlantic Records. The album features contributions from a wide range of musicians, including long-time collaborators John Hill, Switch and Diplo, as well as Dave Sitek of TV on the Radio and Karen O of the Yeah Yeah Yeahs. The cover art of the album, designed by Jason Schmidt, represents four incarnations of Santigold. The album received positive reviews from music critics, and earned Santigold her first number one on the Billboard Dance/Electronic Albums chart, and reached number 21 on the US Billboard 200 and number 33 on the UK Albums Chart.

Release
Master of My Make-Believe was preceded by the singles "Big Mouth" and "Disparate Youth". The song "Go" featuring Karen O premiered in April 2011, but was not available for purchase until the release of the album. In May 2012, Santigold posted a photo on Instagram from the set of the video for "The Keepers", which was released as the third single on June 22, 2012.

Critical reception

At Metacritic, which assigns a normalized rating out of 100 to reviews from mainstream publications, Master of My Make-Believe received an average score of 74, based on 37 reviews, indicating "generally favorable reviews". AllMusic said the album is "the kind of album that can fully define her sound, but is still multifaceted and well crafted enough to be exciting." Chicago Tribune felt that "White's subversive way with a hook and her ability to effortlessly blend dance beats from around the world make Master of My Make-Believe a deceptively breezy and enticing summer album." Los Angeles Times wrote, "Throughout, Santigold never stops playing spin-the-globe, and she also never loses sight of her mission to keep listeners moving." Entertainment Weekly stated that the album's "disgruntled machine-raging and spiky new-wave rhythms evoke both the urgency of early U2 and the agit-pop ire of M.I.A.—while delivering more direct danceability than either." Roberrt Alford of PopMatters wrote, "I would place this album among the strongest work coming out in both the realms of indie and pop music these days, and though it may not inspire the level of critical and popular veneration that her first album enjoyed, it's a welcome return by one of the most inventive and inspired recording artists working today." Slant Magazines Kevin Liedel said, "Santigold's trademark irreverence and penchant for high-energy anthems delivers her sophomore effort from the potential downfalls of miscellany."

Pitchfork critic Carrie Battan gave the album a less favorable review, stating: "A polished assortment of tidily global-sounding, mid-tempo pop tunes that seem to end before they ever kick off, strung together by a checklist of semi-impassioned capital-K Keywords: Youth, Machine, Riot, Fame, Freak, Pirate, Keepers." Rosen Jody of Rolling Stone wrote, "Her songs sound great but feel off, merely gesturing in the direction of emotions. In the end, she's so cool she'll frost up your earbuds." Paste thought that "Master of My Make-Believe is by no means a disappointment, but it falls short of the expectation that has been gestating for the past four years."

Track listing

Notes
  signifies a co-producer
  signifies an additional producer

Personnel
Credits adapted from the liner notes of Master of My Make-Believe.

Musicians
 Santigold – vocals , drums , keyboards , piano 
 Karen O – vocals 
 Nick Zinner – guitar , keyboards 
 Jahphet Landis – drums 
 Anthony Burlitch – drums 
 John Morrical – keyboards 
 Greg Kurstin – drums , keyboards , piano , all other instruments 
 John Hill – keyboards 

Technical

 Santigold – executive production, production , co-production 
 Switch – production , co-production , additional production , mixing 
 Greg Kurstin – production 
 John Hill – production , additional production 
 Diplo – production 
 David Andrew Sitek – production , additional production 
 Ricky Blaze – production , programming 
 Q-Tip – production 
 Boys Noize – production 
 Buraka Som Sistema – production 
 Chris Coady – engineering
 Jesse Shatkin – engineering
 Bryan Gottshall – engineering
 Chris Allen – engineering
 Chris Kasych – engineering
 Sayyd Droullard – engineering
 Zeph Sowers – engineering
 Rich Costey – mixing 
 Eddy Schreyer – mastering

Artwork
 Jason Schmidt – photography
 Kehinde Wiley – painting

Charts

Weekly charts

Year-end charts

References

2012 albums
Albums produced by Dave Sitek
Albums produced by Diplo
Albums produced by Greg Kurstin
Albums produced by Q-Tip (musician)
Albums produced by Switch (songwriter)
Atlantic Records albums
Downtown Records albums
Santigold albums
Dubtronica albums